Paul Verner Erkki Gustafsson (9 April 1923 Helsinki – 23 March 2002 Helsinki) was a Finnish diplomat with a law degree. He served as Head of the Legal Department of the Ministry of Foreign Affairs 1967-1970 and 1973-1976 and was Ambassador to The Hague from 1970 to 1973, OECD Representation in Paris 1976–1977, Undersecretary of State from 1977 to 1980 and Ambassador to Stockholm 1980–1983.
 
He received a diplomatic title of Envoy Extraordinary and Minister Plenipotentiary in 1968.

The parents of Paul Gustafsson were Jaeger Major-General  Verner Gustafsson and opera singer Greta von Haartman.

References 

1923 births
2002 deaths
Diplomats from Helsinki
Lawyers from Helsinki
Ambassadors of Finland to the Netherlands
Ambassadors of Finland to Sweden
Ambassadors of Finland to Ireland
20th-century Finnish lawyers
Finnish expatriates in France